The Southern Pacific  (or Espee from the railroad initials- SP) was an American Class I railroad network that existed from 1865 to 1996 and operated largely in the Western United States. The system was operated by various companies under the names Southern Pacific Railroad, Southern Pacific Company and Southern Pacific Transportation Company.

The original Southern Pacific began in 1865 as a land holding company. The last incarnation of the Southern Pacific, the Southern Pacific Transportation Company, was founded in 1969 and assumed control of the Southern Pacific system. The Southern Pacific Transportation Company was acquired in 1996 by the Union Pacific Corporation and merged with their Union Pacific Railroad.

The Southern Pacific legacy founded hospitals in San Francisco, Tucson, and Houston. In the 1970s, it also founded a telecommunications network with a state-of-the-art microwave and fiber optic backbone. This telecommunications network became part of Sprint, a company whose name came from the acronym for Southern Pacific Railroad Internal Networking Telephony.

History

The original Southern Pacific, Southern Pacific Railroad, was founded as a land holding company in 1865, later acquiring the Central Pacific Railroad in 1885 through leasing. By 1900, the Southern Pacific system was a major railroad system incorporating many smaller companies, such as the Texas and New Orleans Railroad and Morgan's Louisiana and Texas Railroad. It extended from New Orleans through Texas to El Paso, across New Mexico and through Tucson, to Los Angeles, through most of California, including San Francisco and Sacramento. Central Pacific lines extended east across Nevada to Ogden, Utah, and reached north through Oregon to Portland. Other subsidiaries eventually included the St. Louis Southwestern Railway (Cotton Belt), El Paso and Southwestern Railroad,
The SP was the defendant in the landmark 1886 United States Supreme Court case Santa Clara County v. Southern Pacific Railroad, which is often interpreted as having established certain corporate rights under the Constitution of the United States. The Southern Pacific Railroad was replaced by the Southern Pacific Company and assumed the railroad operations of the Southern Pacific Railroad.

In 1969, the Southern Pacific Transportation Company was established and took over the Southern Pacific Company; this Southern Pacific railroad is the last incarnation and was at times called "Southern Pacific Industries", though "Southern Pacific Industries" is not the official name of the company. On October 13, 1988, the Southern Pacific Transportation Company (including its subsidiary, St. Louis Southwestern Railway) was taken over by Rio Grande Industries, the parent company that controlled the Denver and Rio Grande Western Railroad. Rio Grande Industries did not merge the Southern Pacific Transportation Company and the Denver and Rio Grande Western Railroad together, but transferred direct ownership of the Denver and Rio Grande Western Railroad to the Southern Pacific Transportation Company, allowing the combined Rio Grande Industries railroad system to use the Southern Pacific name due to its brand recognition in the railroad industry and with customers of both the Southern Pacific Transportation Company and the Denver and Rio Grande Western Railroad. A long time Southern Pacific subsidiary, the St. Louis Southwestern Railway was also marketed under the Southern Pacific name. Rio Grande Industries was later renamed Southern Pacific Rail Corporation.

The financial problems caused the Southern Pacific Transportation Company to be taken over by the Union Pacific Corporation; the parent Southern Pacific Rail Corporation (formerly Rio Grande Industries), the Denver and Rio Grande Western Railroad, the St. Louis Southwestern Railway and the SPCSL Corporation was also taken over by the Union Pacific Corporation. The Union Pacific Corporation merged the Denver and Rio Grande Western Railroad, the St. Louis Southwestern Railway and the SPCSL Corporation into their Union Pacific Railroad but did not merge the Southern Pacific Transportation Company into the Union Pacific Railroad. Instead, the Union Pacific Corporation merged the Union Pacific Railroad into the Southern Pacific Transportation Company on February 1, 1998; the Southern Pacific Transportation Company became the surviving railroad and at the same time the Union Pacific Corporation renamed the Southern Pacific Transportation Company to Union Pacific Railroad. Thus, the Southern Pacific Transportation Company became, and is still operating as, the current incarnation of the Union Pacific Railroad.

Locomotives 
Like most railroads, the SP painted most of its steam locomotives black during the 20th century, but after 1945 SP painted the front of the locomotive's smokebox silver (almost white in appearance), with graphite colored sides, for visibility.

Some passenger steam locomotives bore the Daylight scheme, named after the trains they hauled, most of which had the word Daylight in the train name. The most famous "Daylight" locomotives were the GS-4 steam locomotives. The most famous Daylight-hauled trains were the Coast Daylight and the Sunset Limited.

Well known were the Southern Pacific's unique "cab-forward" steam locomotives. These were 4-8-8-2, 2-8-8-2, and 4-6-6-2 (rebuilt from 2-6-6-2) locomotives set up to run in reverse, with the tender attached to the smokebox end of the locomotive. Southern Pacific had a number of snow sheds in mountain terrain, and locomotive crews nearly asphyxiated from smoke in the cab. After a number of engineers began running their engines in reverse (pushing the tender), Southern Pacific asked Baldwin Locomotive Works to produce cab-forward designs. No other North American railroad ordered cab-forward locomotives.

Passenger train service 
Until May 1, 1971 (when Amtrak took over long-distance passenger operations in the United States), the Southern Pacific at various times operated the following named passenger trains. Trains with names in italicized bold text still operate under Amtrak:

 49er
 Acadian
 Apache 
 Argonaut
 Arizona Limited 
 Beaver
 Californian
 Cascade 
 City of San Francisco 
 Coast Daylight 
 Coast Mail
 Coaster
 Del Monte
 Fast Mail
 Golden Rocket 
 Golden State 
 Grand Canyon
 Hustler
 Imperial 
 Klamath
 Lark
 Oregonian
 Overland
 Owl
 Pacific Limited
 Peninsula Commute 
 Loop Service
 Rogue River
 Sacramento Daylight
 San Francisco Challenger 
 San Joaquin Daylight
 Senator
 Shasta Daylight
 Shasta Express
 Shasta Limited
 Shasta Limited De Luxe
 Starlight
 Sunbeam
 Sunset Limited
 Suntan Special
 Tehachapi
 West Coast
 El Costeño 
 El Yaqui

Locomotives used for passenger service

Steam locomotives 

 2-8-0 Consolidation
 2-8-2 Mikado
 4-4-2 Atlantic
 4-6-2 Pacific – see SP 2472
 4-8-2 Mountain – see SP Mt-5
 4-8-4 Golden State/General Service – see SP 4449
 2-8-8-4 
 4-8-8-2 Cab Forward Articulated 
 4-10-2 Southern Pacific - see SP 5021

Diesel locomotives 

 ALCO PA
 EMC E2
 EMD E7
 EMD E8
 EMD E9 
 EMD FP7
 GE 70-ton switcher
 EMD NW2
 EMD NW5
 EMD SW1
 EMD SW8
 EMD SW900
 EMD SW1200
 EMD SW1500
 GE U25B
 GE U28B
 GE U30C
 GE U33C
 FM H-12-44
 FM H-24-66 "Train Master"
 EMD GP7 
 EMD GP9 
 EMD SD7
 EMD SD9 
 GE P30CH 
 EMD SD40M-2
 EMD SD39-2
 EMD SD38-2
 EMD SD35
 EMD SDP45
 EMD GP60
 EMD GP40P-2
 EMD GP40M-2
 EMD GP40-2
 EMD GP38-2
 EMD GP20
 EMD SD35
 GE B30-7
 GE B36-7
 GE B39-8
 GE B40-8
 GE AC4400CW
 GE C44-9W
 EMD SD50
 EMD SD45
 EMD SD45T-2
 EMD SD40T-2
 EMD SD40R
 EMD SD70M

Notable accidents
 John Sontag, a young Southern Pacific employee, was injured c. 1888 while coupling cars in the railroad yard in Fresno. He accused the company of not providing him with medical care while he was recuperating from his on-the-job injury and then not rehiring him when he had healed. He soon turned to a life of crime (mostly train robberies) and died of gunshot wounds and tetanus in the Fresno jail in 1893 aged 32 years.

Sontag's partner in crime, Chris Evans also hated the Southern Pacific, which Evans accused of forcing farmers to sell their lands at reduced rates to the company.

Accounts said 9 of the train's 14 cars disintegrated as they piled on top of one another, leaving the dead and injured in "a heap of kindling and crumpled metal". Of the dead, 18 were Italian immigrants traveling to jobs in San Francisco from Genoa, Italy.
 The Coast Line Limited was heading for Los Angeles, California, on 22 May 1907, when it was derailed just west of Glendale, California. Passenger cars reportedly tumbled down the embankment. At least 2 people were killed and others injured. "The horrible deed was planned with devilish accurateness" the Pasadena Star News reported at the time. It said spikes were removed from the track and a hook placed under the end of the rail. The Star'''s coverage was extensive and its editorial blasted the criminal elements behind the wreck:The man or men who committed this horrible deed near Glendale may not be anarchists, technically speaking. But if they are sane men, moved by motive, they are such stuff as anarchists are made of. If the typical anarchist conceived that a railroad corporation should be terrorized, he would not scruple to wreck a passenger train and send scores and hundreds to instant death.
 In the early hours of 1 June 1907, an attempt to derail a Southern Pacific train near Santa Clara, California, was foiled when a pile of railway ties was discovered on the tracks. A work train crew found that someone had driven a steel plate into a switch near Burbank, California, intending to derail the Santa Barbara local.
 On 12 August 1939, the westbound City of San Francisco derailed from a bridge in Palisade Canyon, between Battle Mountain and Carlin in the Nevada desert. Among the passengers and crew members 24 people were killed and many more injured, and 5 cars were destroyed. An act of sabotage was determined to be the most likely cause; however, no suspect(s) was(were) ever identified.
 On New Year's Eve 1944 a rear-end collision west of Ogden in thick fog killed 48 people.
 On 17 January 1947, the Southern Pacific Nightflier wrecked  outside of Bakersfield; 7 people were killed and over 50 injured. Four coaches and a tourist sleeper were overturned, landing far off the tracks; the other seven cars remained upright. The locomotive stayed on the tracks and its crew was uninjured. A 29-year-old passenger, Robert Crowley from Miami, Florida, had been conversing with a man across the aisle who was killed instantly. Crowley, who was a combat war veteran, said “I never saw such a mess” even on a battlefield.
 On 8 May 1948, in Monterey, California, a Southern Pacific passenger train, the Del Monte Express struck a car driven by influential marine biologist Ed Ricketts at the now defunct railroad crossing at Drake Avenue.  Ricketts subsequently succumbed to his injuries three days later in the hospital.
 On 17 September 1963, a Southern Pacific freight train crashed into an illegally converted bus at a grade crossing in Chualar, California, killing 32 bracero workers. It would later be a factor in the decision by Congress in 1964 to terminate the bracero program, despite its strong support among farmers. It also helped spur the Chicano civil rights movement. As of 2014, it was the deadliest automobile accident in United States history, according to the National Safety Council
 On 28 April 1973, a Southern Pacific freight train carrying munitions exploded in Roseville Yard injuring 52 people, the cause of this was due to a hot box on a railcar setting the floor ablaze, heating a bomb until it detonated.
 On 12 May 1989, a Southern Pacific train carrying trona derailed in San Bernardino, California. The train failed to slow while descending a nearby slope, and sped up to about  before derailing, causing the San Bernardino train disaster. The crash destroyed 7 homes along Duffy Street and killed 2 train workers and 2 residents. Thirteen days later on 25 May 1989, an underground pipeline running along the right-of-way ruptured and caught fire due to damage done to the pipeline during clean-up from the derailment or from the derailment itself, destroying 11 more homes and killing 2 more people.

 On the night of 14 July 1991, a Southern Pacific train derailed into the upper Sacramento River at a sharp bend of track called “the Cantara Loop”, upstream from Dunsmuir, California, in Siskiyou County. Several cars made contact with the water, including a tank car. Ultimately, over a million fish, and tens of thousands of amphibians and crayfish were killed. Millions of aquatic invertebrates, including insects and mollusks, which form the basis of the river's ecosystem, were destroyed. Hundreds of thousands of willows, alders, and cottonwoods eventually died; many more were severely injured.

The chemical plume left a  wake of destruction from the spill site to the entry point of the river into Shasta Lake. The accident still ranks as the largest hazardous chemical spill in California history. At the time of the incident, metam sodium was not classified as a hazardous material.

Preserved locomotives
There are many Southern Pacific locomotives still in revenue service with railroads such as the Union Pacific Railroad, and many older and special locomotives have been donated to parks and museums, or continue operating on scenic or tourist railroads. Most of the engines now in use with Union Pacific have been "patched", where the SP logo on the front is replaced by a Union Pacific shield, and new numbers are applied over the old numbers with a Union Pacific sticker, however some engines remain in Southern Pacific "bloody nose" paint. Over the past couple years, most of the patched units were repainted into the full Union Pacific scheme and as of January 2019, less than ten units remain in their old paint. Among the more notable equipment is:
 745 (Mk-5, 2-8-2), owned by the Louisiana Rail Heritage Trust, operated by the Louisiana Steam Train Association, and based in Jefferon (near New Orleans), Louisiana
786 (Mk-5, 2-8-2), owned by the City of Austin, leased to the Austin Steam Train Association. Currently under full mechanical restoration in Austin, Texas.
794 (Mk-5, 2-8-2), the last Mikado built for the Texas and New Orleans Railroad in 1916 out of spare parts in their Houston shops. It currently resides with cosmetic restoration at San Antonio Station, San Antonio, Texas, but plans are to restore it to operating condition.
982 (F-1, 2-10-2), tender located at the Heber Valley Railroad in Heber City, Utah, main locomotive located in Houston, Texas.
1518 (EMD SD7), former EMD demonstrator 990 and first SD7 built, located at the Illinois Railway Museum, Union, Illinois
1744 (M-6, 2-6-0), components slowly being gathered at Brightside, California for a restoration to operating condition on the Niles Canyon Railway.
2248 Puffy (T-1, 4-6-0), operated by the Grapevine Vintage Railroad, but is currently pending for a 1,472-day overhaul required by the FRA in Grapevine, Texas.
2353 (T-31, 4-6-0), on display at the Pacific Southwest Railway Museum in Campo, California.
2467 (P-8, 4-6-2), on loan by the Pacific Locomotive Association, Fremont, California to the California State Railroad Museum
2472 (P-8, 4-6-2), owned and operated by the Golden Gate Railroad Museum, Redwood City, California
2479 (P-10, 4-6-2), owned and being restored by the California Trolley and Railroad Corporation, San Jose, California
3100 (former SP6800 Bicentennial), U25B owned and operated by the Orange Empire Railway Museum, Perris, CA
 3420 (C-19, 2-8-0), owned by El Paso Historic Board, stored at Phelps Dodge copper refinery, El Paso, Texas
 3709 (EMD GP9), being restored to operation at Pacific Southwest Railway Museum in Campo, California
3769 (EMD GP9), On display and used as a switch engine for the Utah State Railroad Museum in Ogden, Utah.
4294 (AC-12, 4-8-8-2), located at the California State Railroad Museum, Sacramento, California
 4449 (GS-4, 4-8-4), formerly located at the Brooklyn Roundhouse before being relocated to the Oregon Rail Heritage Center in June 2012, Portland, Oregon
4460 (GS-6, 4-8-4), located at the National Museum of Transportation, Kirkwood, Missouri
5119 (GE 70-ton switcher), Operational and awaiting paint restoration to SP colors at Pacific Southwest Railway Museum in Campo, California
7304 (ALCO RS-32), on display awaiting restoration at Pacific Southwest Railway Museum in Campo, California
7457 (EMD SD45) the first GM Electro-Motive Division SD45 diesel-electric road switcher locomotive to be built for that railroad in 1966. It last saw service on Donner Pass. It was donated to the Utah State Railroad Museum in 2002.For a complete list, see: List of preserved Southern Pacific Railroad rolling stock. Honorary tribute 
On August 19, 2006, UP unveiled a brand new EMD SD70ACe locomotive, Union Pacific 1996, as part of a new heritage program. It was the final unit in UP's Heritage Series of locomotives, and was painted in a color scheme inspired by the "Daylight" and "Black Widow" schemes.

Company officers
Presidents

 Timothy Guy Phelps (1865–1868)
 Charles Crocker (1868–1885)
 Leland Stanford (1885–1890)
 Collis P. Huntington (1890–1900)
 Charles Melville Hays (1900–1901)
 E. H. Harriman (1901–1909)
 Robert S. Lovett (1909–1911)
 William Sproule (1911–1918)
 Julius Kruttschnitt (1918–1920)
 William Sproule (1920–1928)
 Paul Shoup (1929–1932)
 Angus Daniel McDonald (1932–1941)
 Armand Mercier (1941–1951)
 Donald J. Russell (1952–1964)
 Benjamin F. Biaggini (1964–1976)
 Denman McNear (1976–1979)
 Alan Furth (1979–1982)
 Robert Krebs (1982–1988)
 D. M. "Mike" Mohan (1988–1993)
 Edward L. Moyers (1993–1995)
 Jerry R. Davis (1995–1996)

Chairmen of Executive Committee
 Leland Stanford (1890–1893)
 (vacant 1893–1909)
 Robert S. Lovett (1909–1913)
 Julius Kruttschnitt (1913–1925)
 Henry deForest (1925–1928)
 Hale Holden (1928–1932)

Chairmen of Board of Directors
 Henry deForest (1929–1932)
 Hale Holden (1932–1939)
 (position nonexistent 1939–1964)
 Donald J. Russell (1964–1972)
 Benjamin F. Biaggini (1976–1982)
 Denman K. McNear (1982–1988)
 Edward L. Moyers  (1993–1995) Chairman/C.E.O.

Notable employees
 Carl Ingold Jacobson, Los Angeles, California, City Council member, 1925–33
 W. Burch Lee, employee in New Orleans office, along with his father, John Martin Lee Jr., before serving in the Louisiana House of Representatives
 Blake R. Van Leer, President of Georgia Tech, United States Army Officer and Hydraulic process inventor 
 Charles Wright, Land Surveyor for the railway, before becoming a botanist
 Jack Kerouac, Novelist
 Harry K. McClintock, San Francisco, Switchman 9/16/1917-4/8/1920, Singer-Songwriter The Big Rock Candy Mountains
 Jimmie Rodgers (country singer), Father of Country Music, Singer-Songwriter

See also

 History of rail transportation in California
 El Paso and Southwestern Railroad
 Long Wharf (Santa Monica)
 Mussel Slough Tragedy
 Pacific Fruit Express
 Santa Fe–Southern Pacific merger
 Southern Pacific 4449
 Southern Pacific Depot
 St. Louis Southwestern Railway
 Texas and New Orleans Railroad
 TOPS (Total Operations Processing System), rolling stock management system jointly developed with IBM and Stanford University and used by SP until 1980, still used by British Rail and successor system

Notes

References

General

 
 

 
 
 
 Daggett, Stuart. Chapters on the History of the Southern Pacific (1922) online. detailed history
 
 Darton, D.H. Guidebook of the Western United States; Part F. The Southern Pacific Lines, New Orleans to Los Angeles. Geological Survey Bulletin 845. Washington (D.C.): Government Printing Office, 1933.
 
 Hofsommer, Donovan; The Southern Pacific, 1901–1985. Texas A&M University Press; (1986) .
 Hofsommer, Don L. "Rivals for California: The Great Northern and the Southern Pacific, 1905-1931." Montana: The Magazine of Western History 38.2 (1988): 58–67.

 

 
 
 

 

External links

 Sphts.org: Southern Pacific Historical & Technical Society
 Harvard Business School, Lehman Brothers Collection: "History of the Southern Pacific Transportation Company" 
 Union Pacific Railroad.com: Union Pacific History
 "Across the Great Salt Lake, The Lucin Cutoff" — 1937 article''.
 Abandoned Rails.com: History of the Santa Ana and Newport Railroad.

 
Predecessors of the Union Pacific Railroad
Rail lines receiving land grants
Railway companies established in 1865
Railway companies disestablished in 1996
Former Class I railroads in the United States
Defunct Arizona railroads
Defunct California railroads
Defunct Louisiana railroads
Defunct Nevada railroads
Defunct New Mexico railroads
Defunct Oregon railroads
Defunct Texas railroads
Defunct Utah railroads
Defunct Kansas railroads
Defunct Oklahoma railroads
Defunct Colorado railroads
Defunct Arkansas railroads
Defunct Missouri railroads
Defunct Tennessee railroads
Defunct Illinois railroads
Companies based in San Francisco
History of San Francisco
History of the Mojave Desert region
3 ft gauge railways in the United States
1865 establishments in California
1996 mergers and acquisitions